Lansdowne Reef; Len Đao Reef;  Mandarin , is a cay on the southern part of the Union Banks of the Spratly Islands in the South China Sea. The island has been occupied by Vietnam since 1988. It is also claimed by China (PRC), the Philippines, Vietnam, and Taiwan (ROC).

See also
Spratly Islands dispute

References

External links
Asia Maritime Transparency Initiative Island Tracker

Reefs of the Spratly Islands
Reefs of Vietnam
Union Banks